Eduardo Soutullo (born May 16, 1968) is a Spanish composer who began his musical education at the Conservatorio Superior de Música de Vigo. Later, he moved to Madrid and to Paris completing his studies in Harmony and Composition with Isabelle Duha (Conservatoire d'Issy les Molineaux-Paris XIII)

He has studied musical composition with David del Puerto, Jesús Rueda,  (Köln Conservatory), Richard Steinitz (Huddersfield University) and with Cristobal Halffter and Tomás Marco (Villafranca del Bierzo, Spain).

He has a master's degree from the Universidad Complutense de Madrid, and has a Doctorat (PhD) from the Universidad de Vigo (thesis about Spanish contemporary music)

He has been a professor at the Conservatory of Vigo and Conservatory of Ourense (Spain).

He has been composer in residence at Academy of Spain in Rome (Real Academia de España en Roma – RAER) in the course 2019-2020

In February 2022, after the beginning of the Russian invasion in Ukraine, he began the composition of Threnus Helianthuses (The lament of sunflowers, a direct reference to Ukraine's national flower), a vocal-symphonic work whose lyrics are anti-war verses of the prominent Ukrainian poetess Lesya Ukrainka (1871-1913) translated into English. He submits the score to the "XVI Open composers competition named after Andrey Petrov" held in Saint Petersburg. Against all odds, the work is selected as a finalist and gets its premiere on September 15, 2022 at the Grand Hall of the St. Petersburg Academic Philharmonic by the St.Petersburg Symphony Orchestra winning the third prize of the competition

He is also the author of the novel "Olozábal, el último zarzuelista, en el Madrid de la movida" published on Amazon and Smashwords

He is also the author of several documentaries such as Film me (on Cuba) winner of awards at international festivals such as CinemAmbiente (Torino, Italy) and Festival International de Programs Audiovisuels (FIPA, Biarritz, France)

Style 
Musicologist Robert Fallon has written, "Eduardo Soutullo's triptych All the Echoes Listen, But in Vain and They Hear no Answering Strain, dedicates each movement to Messiaen, Takemitsu and Grisey. Melodies in All the Echoes Listen have the "Chant d'extase" contour and They Hear no Answering Strain sounds a five-note descending octatonic scale in strings much like Le tombeau resplendissant."

Awards and honors 

 First Prize "X Edition of the AEOS-BBVA Foundation Composition Prize" (Spanish Association of Symphony Orchestras)
First Prize "VII Composition Competition New Note – Croatia 2018" – Croatian Radio and Television Symphony Orchestra – 43rd Samobor Music Festival
First Prize "Lawson-May Award for Composition 2020" (Solent Music Festival, Lymington, United Kingdom)
Third Prize "XVI Open composers competition named after Andrey Petrov" (St. Petersburg Academic Philharmonic)
 Finalist "RED NOTE New Music Festival Composition Competition - Illinois State University Symphony Orchestra (November 2018)
 Honourable Mention in  Lutoslawski Award 2007, (Warsaw, December 17, 2007), Chairman of the jury, Zygmunt Krauze
 Finalist at International Profofiev Competition (St. Petersburg, April 2008), Chairman of the jury, Rodion Shchedrin
 Third Prize International Composition Competition ITALY 150,  Chairman of the jury, Magnus Lindberg)
 Third Prize International Composition Competition Auditorio Nacional - Fundación BBVA, Chairman of the jury, Tristán Murail.
 Finalist at GESAMT project organized by filmmaker Lars von Trier  with Copenhagen Art Festival, the Danish Film Institute and Zentropa
 Finalist at  XXVI Queen Sofía Composition Prize 2008 with his PIano Concerto
 First Prize in "Ciutat de Tarragona International Award for Musical Composition" in 2005.
 First Prize  in "7th Manuel Valcárcel International Piano Composition Competition" (Marcelino Botín Foundation). The work has been premiered by Ananda Sukarlan in Santander International Festival, August 2008
 He has been one of the three composers selected to represent Spain at the World Music Days 2009 ( ISCM / International Society of Contemporary Music).

Works

Opera 

 Romance de lobos (2017) based on the theatrical play Romance de lobos written by Ramón María del Valle-Inclán

Orchestral (selection) 

 All the echoes listen (2005), winner of the Ciutat de Tarragona International Award for Musical Composition".
 But in vain (2006), commissioned and premiered by Orquesta Real Filharmonia de Galicia
 They Hear no Answering Strain (2008), commissioned and premiered by Orquesta Sinfónica de Galicia and conductor Josep Pons
 Erfahrung und sonst nichts (2010), winner of Third Prize in International Composition Competition Auditorio Nacional - Fundación BBVA, premiered by Orquesta Nacional de España conducted by José Luis Temes
 Jobs and Gates at dawn (2015) commissioned and premiered by Orquesta Ciudad de Granada and conductor Virginia Martínez
Alén (2019), winner of "X Edition of the AEOS-BBVA Foundation Composition Prize"

Soloist and orchestra 

 That scream called silence (Piano Concerto) (2007), finalist of the Queen Sofía Composition Prize 2008, premiered by Ananda Sukarlan (piano) and Orquesta Sinfónica de RTVE conducted by Adrian Leaper
 The other face of the wind (Clarinet concerto) (2010), commissioned and premiered by José Luis Estellés (clarinet) Joven Orquesta Nacional de España and conductor Patrick Davin

Chamber, vocal and solo works (selection) 

 Have you said spectral? (2007, for solo piano), winner of "7th Manuel Valcárcel International Piano Composition Competition" (Marcelino Botín Foundation). Premiered at New York   by Isabel Pérez Dobarro
Lira de sombra -Isaac Albéniz in memoriam (2009, for solo piano), commissioned by Fundacion Albéniz.  Performed by Gustavo Díaz-Jerez
 Cantigas de Martín Codax (2010, for soprano and piano), with the text of Cantigas de Amigo. Premiered at Carnegie Hall, New York.
Aut Caesar, aut nihil (2012, for mixed choir), premiered at "Semana de Música Religiosa de Cuenca"
Noh Quartet, (2014, for string quartet), Premiered at "Xornadas de Música Contemporánea" (Santiago de Compostela) by Breton String Quartet
 Le sourire d'Isabelle H. (2017 for ensemble, fl. cl. vl. vch. and piano), commissioned and premiered by Grup Instrumental de Valencia conducted by Joan Cerveró.

Recordings (selection) 

All the echoes listen, by Swedish Radio Symphony Orchestra conducted by B Tommy Andersson. Sverige Radio (Live recording)
All the echoes listen (abridged version) by Orchestre national de Lorraine conducted by Jacques Mercier. IRCAM.
Jobs And Gates At Dawn (and Other Uchronias) by Orquesta Real Filharmonia de Galicia conducted by Paul Daniel. Odradek Records Atlantic Waters 
But in vain, by Orquesta Real Filharmonia de Galicia. Fundacion SGAE Records New symphonic works 1
 Erfahrung und sonst nichts, by Orquesta Nacional de España. Verso Records.
 Recitativ, Aria, Scherzo, by Roberto Alonso Trillo, Ouvirmos Records
 I've got you under my string, by Adam Levin (guitar). NAXOS Records

External links 

 Eduardo Soutullo official web site http://eduardosoutullo.com/
List of works (selection) at Biblioteca Nacional de España
Scores published in Trito Ed.
Interview with Jose Luís García del Busto, Mario Carro and Joan Magrané. Fundación Maphre, July 15, 2011.
Interview in Diario de León, July 28, 2011.
Interview with Arturo Reverter, May 6, 2012.
Interview in Televisión de Galicia, November 21, 2012
Interview in Televisión de Galicia, November 2, 2018.

Further reading 

 Fallon, Robert. 2013. Messiaen Perspectives 2: Techniques, Influence and Reception, pp 259, 261.

Notes 

"Eduardo Soutullo puesta por rescartar la emotividad de la música en Santander", ABC, August 23, 2008.
"Eduardo Soutullo, clásico aos 40 anos", EL PAIS, December 12, 2008.
"La Sinfónica de Galicia homenajea a los grandes compositores en Lisboa", El Progreso, March 7, 2009
 "El gallego Eduardo Soutullo, finalista de los Premios Reina Sofía", La voz de Galicia, March 12, 2009
 "Soutullo y los ecos en soledad", EL PAIS, April 17, 2009
"Concierto de obras finalistas del XXVI Premio Reina SofÍa de composición musical", Agencia EFE, December 8, 2009.
"La Sinfónica estrena a Soutullo bajo la batuta de Rizzi", EL PAIS, February 8, 2011.
"-La otra cara del viento- es la segunda obra de Eduardo Soutullo para solista", Diario de León, July 21, 2011
"La música del vigués Eduardo Soutullo sonará en Chicago", Atlántico Diario, August 12, 2014
"Una mirada española a la leyenda de Ibn Battuta, el viajero del tiempo", EL MUNDO, October 17, 2016.
"La OCG estrena 'Jobs and gates at dawn', de Eduardo Soutullo", Granada Hoy, November 4, 2016.
"Una orquesta de Hong Kong estrena una pieza del compositor Eduardo Soutullo", Faro de Vigo, March 20, 2017
 "Del amanecer a la Feria", EL PAIS, October 28, 2017.
"Vanguardia en marcha", Diario de Sevilla, November 13, 2017.
"Tres estrenos en el Ciclo de Música Contemporánea de la Quincena", Gara, August 19, 2018
"Eduardo Soutullo gana el primer premio de la Orquesta Sinfónica de la Radio-Televisión de Croacia", Faro de Vigo, September 30, 2018.
"Soutullo triunfa en EE.UU. pero no puede estrenar una ópera en Galicia", La Voz de Galicia, December 4, 2018
"La Real Filharmonía estrena con éxito la Suite Sinfónica nº 1 de Eduardo Soutullo", EL PAIS, June 15, 2019
"Eduardo Soutullo obtiene dos premios en competiciones de Croacia y Tailandia", Faro de Vigo, August 2, 2019
"Alén de Eduardo Soutullo gana el X Premio de Composición AEOS-Fundación BBVA", ABC, November 20, 2019
"Eduardo Soutullo estrena en Roma su quinteto Pentaphonics", La Voz de Galicia, July 4, 2020
"Roma: recinti sacri e spazializzazione sonora", Piazza di spagna, July 5, 2020
"Eduardo Soutullo gana el Premio Lawson-May", EL PAIS, August 3, 2020

References 

20th-century Spanish male musicians
Living people
Complutense University of Madrid alumni
University of Vigo alumni
Spanish male composers
People from Bilbao
20th-century composers
21st-century composers
1968 births
Spanish expatriates in France
Spanish expatriates in Germany
Spanish expatriates in the United Kingdom
21st-century male musicians